Rufus Parnell Jones (born August 12, 1933) is an American former professional racing driver and racing team owner. He is notable for his accomplishments while competing in the Indianapolis 500 and the Baja 1000 desert race. In 1962, he became the first driver to qualify over 150 mph. He won the race in 1963, then famously broke down while leading the 1967 race with three laps to go in a turbine car. During his career as an owner, he won the Indy 500 in 1970–1971 with driver Al Unser, Sr.

Jones won races in many types of vehicles: sports cars, IndyCars, sprint cars, midget cars, off-road vehicles, and stock cars. He is also remembered for bringing the stock block engine to USAC Sprint car racing as one of the "Chevy Twins" with Jim Hurtubise. He is associated with the famous Boss 302 Mustang with his wins using the engine in the 1970s. Jones' son P. J. Jones was also a diverse driver, with IndyCar and NASCAR starts and a championship in IMSA prototype sports cars. His other son Page Jones was an up-and-coming driver before suffering career ending (and life-threatening) injuries in a sprint car at the 4-Crown Nationals, and has been in rehabilitation, working with his father-in-law. Following the death of 1960 Indianapolis 500 winner Jim Rathmann, Jones is now the oldest living "500" winner.

Driving career
Born in Texarkana, Arkansas, Jones' family moved to Torrance, California, where he grew up (and lives in nearby Rolling Hills). He was nicknamed Parnelli by his boyhood friend Billy Calder, who hoped that the Jones family would not discover their son was racing cars as a 17-year-old minor. Jones participated in his first race in a Jalopy race at Carrell Speedway in Gardena, California. He developed his racing skills by racing in many different classes in the 1950s, including 15 stock car racing wins in the NASCAR Pacific Coast Late Model Series.

His first major championship was the Midwest region Sprint car title in 1960. The title caught the attention of promoter J. C. Agajanian, who became his sponsor. He began racing at Indianapolis in 1961.

Jones was named the 1961 Indianapolis 500 Rookie of the Year, an honor that he shared with Bobby Marshman. Jones led early in the race and ran among the leaders until being hit in the face with a stone, bloodying his face, blurring his vision and slowing him to a 12th-place finish.

Jones dominated the first two-thirds of the race until a brake line failure slowed him, and he settled for a seventh-place finish.

In the 1963 Indianapolis 500, he started on the pole. This was the year the controversial Lotus-Ford rear-engined cars made their first appearance, and had ruffled the Indianapolis establishment. Before the race, the chief steward, Harlan Fengler, told the teams that he would black-flag any cars that leaked oil on the track, warning, "Don't believe me, just try me."

With Scotsman Jim Clark in a Lotus-Ford closing on Jones in the waning laps, Jones' car developed a horizontal crack in the external oil reservoir. At that moment, driver Eddie Sachs crashed on the oil-slickened racing surface and brought out a yellow caution flag, slowing the field. Agajanian, Jones' car owner, argued with chief steward Harlan Fengler not to issue a black flag, insisting the oil level had dropped below the level of the crack, and that the leak had stopped. As Agajanian pleaded with Fengler, Lotus head man Colin Chapman rushed up to join the conversation and demanded that Fengler follow the rules about disqualifying cars with oil leaks. With the end of the race just minutes away, Fengler took no action, and Jones went on to win. The Lotus-Ford team, while unhappy with the obvious favoritism displayed by race officials toward Jones and Agajanian, also acknowledged Jones' clear superiority in the event. In addition, Ford officials recognized that a victory through disqualification of Clark's biggest competitor would not be well received by the public, so they declined to protest.

Also that year, legendary vehicle fabricator Bill Stroppe built a Mercury Marauder USAC Stock car for Jones. Jones won the 1963 Pikes Peak International Hill Climb in the car, and broke the stock car speed record.

In 1964, he won seven races (and tied for a win) on his way to the USAC Stock car crown. He won the Turkey Night Grand Prix midget car event. Mercury decided to pull out of stock car racing after the season. The following year, Jones almost won Indy for a second time, finishing second behind Jim Clark.

He won five of the nine midget car events that he entered in 1966, including the Turkey Night Grand Prix. He finished fourteenth in the final points despite competing in only nine of 65 events.

In 1967, he drove in the Indianapolis 500 for owner Andy Granatelli in the revolutionary STP-Paxton Turbocar. Jones dominated the race but dropped out with three laps to go when a small, inexpensive transmission bearing broke. After 1968, turbine-powered cars were legislated out of competitiveness.

Also in 1967, as part of his stock car contract with the Lincoln-Mercury division of the Ford Motor Company, Jones drove a Mercury Cougar for Bud Moore in the second-year Trans Am series. In April, Jones dueled with teammate, friend and rival Dan Gurney in a brutal , 4-hour event at Green Valley, Texas in 113-degree heat, losing by inches to Gurney.

Stroppe suggested that Jones try his hand at off-road racing in front of a large crowd at a Christmas party in 1967. Jones at first said no, since he had enough of dirt. Stroppe suggested that maybe off-road racing was too hard for Jones, and the challenge started Jones' off-road career. Jones and Stroppe teamed up for the  Star Dust 7/11 race across the Nevada desert in early 1968. Jones had never driven or pre-run the Ford Bronco. Jones hit a dry wash at full speed, which broke the wheels and blew out the front tires. Jones would later have a guest appearance in the original film Gone in 60 Seconds featuring him and his Bronco which was stolen in the plot. Jones had become hooked on off-road racing.

In 1968, Jones headed a super-roster of seven drivers signed by Andy Granatelli to drive STP Lotus 56 turbine cars in an unprecedented single-team assault on the Indianapolis 500. The deaths of Jim Clark and Mike Spence, plus a serious injury to Jackie Stewart, whittled the entry to four. Jones, testing his reworked 1967 car in practice, was dissatisfied with the car's performance compared to the newer "wedge"-shaped Lotus 56 turbines, and had concluded the car was unsafe. He stepped out of the car, which was subsequently assigned to Joe Leonard, who promptly wrecked the car in practice. Jones retired from driving IndyCars, but later admitted, "If I hadn't already won Indy, they could never have kept me out of that car."

Jones entered the 1968 NORRA Mexican 1000 (now Baja 1000). Jones led until the  marker. The Off-road Motorsports Hall of Fame describes Jones' racing style: "Jones and Stroppe had to find a way to keep their vehicles in one piece. During races Jones would push the vehicles at maximum speeds until they gave way, with Stroppe telling him at top volume the entire time to take it easier on the vehicle."

Jones had a special car fabricated that looked like a Bronco, but had racing parts that could withstand rigorous jarring that off-road vehicles endure. Jones named the vehicle "Big Oly" after his sponsor Olympia Beer. Jones used the vehicle to lead the Mexican 1000 from start to finish in a new record time of 14 hours and 59 minutes.

Jones had major wins in the 1973 season. He won his second Mexican 1000 in 16 hours and 42 minutes. He also won the 1973 Baja 500 and Mint 400 off-road events. Jones had a major accident at SCORE International's 1974 Baja 500, and stepped away from full-time off-road racing to become a race car owner. "Big Oly" was sold in May 2020 for $1.7 million.

Jones raced SCCA Trans Am sedans owned by Bud Moore: Mercury Cougar (1967) and Ford Mustang (1969—1971). Parnelli's dominance of the extremely competitive 1970 season brought Ford the manufacturer's championship.

Driving career summary
Jones retired with six IndyCar wins and twelve pole positions, four wins in 34 NASCAR starts, including the 1967 Motor Trend 500 at Riverside, 25 midget car feature wins in occasional races between 1960 and 1967, and 25 career sprint car wins. His fifteen wins is eighth on the all-time in NASCAR Pacific Coast Late Model history.

In 1993, Jones took part in the Fast Masters. He advanced to the final championship round and placed 6th overall.

Car owner

Jones started Vel’s Parnelli Jones Racing, which won the Indianapolis 500 again as an owner in 1970 and 1971 with driver Al Unser driving the Johnny Lightning special. The team also won the 1970, 1971, and 1972 USAC National Championships.

Jones owned the Parnelli Formula One race team from late 1974 to early 1976, although it achieved little success.

Jones returned to off-road racing as owner of Walker Evans' 1976 SCORE truck, and Evans won the championship. They teamed up for the 1977 CORE Class 2 championship.

Jones owned vehicles that took class wins at the Baja 500 and Baja 1000. His USAC Dirt Car won two championships and the Triple Crown three times.

Documentary 
Jones starred in the one-hour documentary Behind the Indianapolis 500 with Parnelli Jones.  Narrated by Bob Varsha, the film takes viewers behind the scenes of the Indianapolis 500, through the eyes and experiences of Parnelli Jones. In addition to Parnelli, Rick Mears, Mario Andretti, Bobby Unser, Al Unser Jr., P. J. Jones, Chip Ganassi, and others are interviewed throughout. The film was selected for the 2016 Sun Valley Film Festival, which Parnelli and Bob Varsha attended.

Career awards
Jones is inducted in over 20 Halls of Fame  including:
the Off-road Motorsports Hall of Fame (1976) 
the Indianapolis Motor Speedway Hall of Fame (1985)
the International Motorsports Hall of Fame (1990)
the National Midget Auto Racing Hall of Fame (1990) 
the National Sprint Car Hall of Fame (1991)
the Motorsports Hall of Fame of America (1992)
the West Coast Stock Car Hall of Fame (2002)

Businessman
Jones owned and operated several successful businesses. He owned Parnelli Jones Inc., which operated 47 retail Parnelli Jones Tire Centers in four states. Parnelli Jones Enterprises was a chain of Firestone Racing Tires in 14 Western United States. Parnelli Jones Wholesale was a reseller which sold and distributed shock absorbers, passenger car tires, and other automotive products to retail tire dealers.
In addition, Parnelli Jones has several wheel manufacturers companies since the beginning of the 70s, z.b. Rebel Wheel co, US Mags and American Racing Equipment.

2007 Ford Mustang Limited Edition
Saleen, Incorporated, in Irvine, California, produced a limited edition (500 unit) 2007 Saleen S302 PJ commemorating Parnelli's 1970 SCCA Ford Mustang Boss 302 racer. This limited-production mustang comes with a stroked out version of the stock Mustang GT 281 c.i. engine. Other special performance enhancements to this car include a special Watts-Link suspension unique to the 1970 Boss Mustang used by Parnelli Jones.

Complete USAC Championship Car results

Indianapolis 500 results

References

External links

VPJ Racing Collection Website
Biography
The Greatest 33

1933 births
Formula One team owners
Living people
People from Texarkana, Arkansas
Racing drivers from Arkansas
Indianapolis 500 drivers
Indianapolis 500 polesitters
Indianapolis 500 Rookies of the Year
Indianapolis 500 winners
International Motorsports Hall of Fame inductees
NASCAR drivers
Trans-Am Series drivers
National Sprint Car Hall of Fame inductees
Off-road racing drivers
Sportspeople from Torrance, California
IndyCar Series team owners
Racing drivers from California
USAC Stock Car drivers